William Wright (15 January 1837 – 31 July 1899) was an Irish missionary in Damascus and the author of The Empire of the Hittites (1884), which introduced the history of the recently discovered Hittite civilization to the general public. He is the author of the quote Absence of evidence is not evidence.

Publications
 The Empire Of The Hittites, with the Decipherment of the Hittite Inscriptions by Professor A. H. Sayce
 The Brontes in Ireland
 An Account Of Palmyra And Zenobia: With Travels And Adventures In Bashan And The Desert

References

Sources

1837 births
1899 deaths